The Rocky Mountains of North America include more than one thousand named mountain passes (topographic saddle points).

Table

See also

 List of mountain passes
 Rocky Mountains
 Canadian Rockies
 Central Rocky Mountains
 Western Rocky Mountains
 Southern Rocky Mountains
 Mountain pass
 List of mountain passes in Colorado
 List of mountain passes in Montana
 List of mountain passes in Wyoming
 List of railroad crossings of the Continental Divide of North America
 List of Rocky Mountain passes on the Continental Divide of the Americas

References

External links

Rocky Mountain Passes
Rocky Mountain Passes
Rocky Mountain Passes
Rocky Mountain Passes
Passes